Vijayaba National School is a combined national primary and secondary school located in Hungama, Sri Lanka.

It was established in 1930 and provides education to students from Grades 1 to 13 in Sinhala and English.

Schools in Hambantota District